Robert McKissock Barnes Orr (26 January 1891 – 2 June 1948) was a Scottish footballer who played as a left back.

Professional career

His longest spell at club level was 15 years with Third Lanark (this was interrupted by World War I, although the Scottish Football League continued); the closest he came to winning a trophy in this time was reaching two finals of the Glasgow Merchants Charity Cup in 1910 (lost on a tally of corners following a draw) and 1914 (a 6–0 defeat to Celtic), and the final of the Glasgow Cup in 1923 (a loss to Rangers).

Later in his career he also turned out for Morton, Dumbarton and Clydebank, as well as for Crystal Palace in English football, for whom he made 70 league appearances, scoring twice.

Orr was selected to play for Scotland in an unofficial Victory International in 1919, played twice for the Scottish Football League XI and toured North America in 1921  and South America in 1923 with 'Scotland' (in reality, Third Lanark with a number of capable guest players).

References

1891 births
1948 deaths
Scottish footballers
Sportspeople from Clydebank
Footballers from West Dunbartonshire
Association football fullbacks
Scottish Junior Football Association players
Clydebank Juniors F.C. players
Clydebank F.C. (1914) players
Third Lanark A.C. players
Greenock Morton F.C. players
Dumbarton F.C. players
Crystal Palace F.C. players
British Army personnel of World War I
Royal Army Service Corps soldiers
Scottish Football League players
English Football League players
Scotland wartime international footballers
Scottish Football League representative players